Rosenstein's sign, also known as Sitkovskiy sign, is a sign of acute appendicitis.

It is observed when tenderness in the right lower quadrant increases when the patient moves from the supine position to a recumbent posture on the left side.

Etymology
The sign is named after the almost forgotten Jewish German physician and director of The Jewish Hospital, Berlin, Paul Rosenstein (1875–1964). Sitkovskiy's symptom is the equivalent symptom.

References

Medical signs